Richard Theodore Evey (February 13, 1941 – May 23, 2013) was an offensive tackle and defensive tackle in the NFL. He played most of his career with the Chicago Bears. After his football career, Evey became a land developer in Blount County, Tennessee, where he was involved in restoring historic Perry's Mill, a working gristmill in Walland, Tennessee.

He was traded from the Bears to the Rams for Ron Smith and Jim Seymour on September 1, 1970.

On May 23, 2013, Evey died from dementia and primary progressive aphasia. From 2007 until his death, Evey was a recipient of the 88 Plan, designed to help former NFL players suffering from Alzheimer's disease, ALS, and Parkinson's disease by providing $88,000 annually for medical care.

References

1941 births
2013 deaths
American football defensive linemen
American football offensive linemen
Chicago Bears players
Detroit Lions players
Los Angeles Rams players
Tennessee Volunteers football players
Sportspeople from Springfield, Ohio
People from State College, Pennsylvania
Players of American football from Ohio